Yannick Vero (born 28 February 1990) is a soccer player from Tahiti currently playing for AS Dragon and for Tahiti national football team.
He was part of the Tahiti squad at the 2013 FIFA Confederations Cup in Brazil.

References

External links
 

1990 births
Living people
French Polynesian footballers
Tahiti international footballers
2012 OFC Nations Cup players
2013 FIFA Confederations Cup players
Association football fullbacks